Phoenix Country Day School is a college-preparatory school located in Paradise Valley, Arizona, United States. It has an enrollment of 750 students in pre-kindergarten through grade 12 and follows a liberal-arts curriculum.

The student-faculty ratio at Phoenix Country Day School is 9 to 1. The school is organized into a lower school (pre-k through grade 4), a middle school (grades 5–8), and an upper school (grades 9–12).

Facilities on the campus include computer infrastructure, science labs, art studios, a music building, two gymnasiums, swimming pools, tennis courts, athletic fields, and outdoor play areas.

The school is accredited by the National Association of Independent Schools and the Independent Schools Association of the Southwest.

History

Phoenix Country Day School was founded in 1960, when a group of educators led by Franz and Mae Sue Talley agreed to found a nonsectarian, nonprofit, college preparatory day school based on the traditional east coast private school model.  Franz Talley was the founder of an aerospace/defense contractor in Mesa, which grew into conglomerate Talley Industries before the businesses were largely sold off in the years after his death in 1978.

On 12 September 1961, Phoenix Country Day School opened its doors to 93 students in grades 3 through 9 with a faculty and staff of 14. The following year, a half-day kindergarten and grades 1 and 2 were added, and grades 10 through 12 were added in successive years to graduate the first senior class in 1965.  By the 1969–1970 academic year, enrollment was at 386.

In the 1970s, facilities were expanded to accommodate the growing student body and the development of competitive sports teams. The school's graduating classes measured in the teens and twenties, and the upper school program offered core graduation requirements and courses and electives that reflected faculty interests and abilities.

In the 1980s, Phoenix Country Day School implemented an Advanced Placement program that was added to assist in gauging standards of academic skill. Having purchased the second half of the school's now-40 acres in 1968, Phoenix Country Day School was able in 1982 to build a new upper school complex and a gymnasium for indoor sports on the east side of the Cudia Wash, and a dedicated music facility on the west side of campus. A bridge was built to join the lower and middle schools with the upper school.

By 1996 enrollment reached 700. Between 1993 and 2008, the school replaced or renovated over 90% of its classrooms. Every division saw major construction and renovation, including the addition of state-of-the-art science labs and an outdoor experimental science garden, visual art and performance facilities, and technology facilities. The entire lower school was replaced, and an early childhood learning center was added. This part of campus also has its own library, science center, art studio, and children's garden.

School sections
The lower school consists of approximately 200 students in grades K through 4, and the core curriculum is expanded by the study of music, art, science, physical education, technology, library science, and Spanish.

The middle school has 250 students in grades 5 through 8 with class sizes at 20 students or below. For these students, the school offers athletics programs, class trips and student council opportunities.

The upper school students mix a liberal arts-based academic schedule with sports, social activities, and community service. 12 Advanced Placement subjects are offered   and students can select from 17 varsity sports and 15 extracurricular activities.

Thrive campaign 
On the school's annual Blue and Gold Day (17 October 2014), the school kicked off its THRIVE fundraising campaign with a video featuring many faculty members and students. The campaign promised to bring about new projects, such as a new indoor athletic complex and art/science center.

Extracurricular programs
Phoenix Country Day School offers extracurricular programs for all ages.

Junior Classical League 
The school's Junior Classical League has won many State Conventions in the Junior Classical League. The school has both a middle school and upper school team which it sends to the convention every year, with the upper school having won the past three conventions in a row.

Speech and debate 
The school's policy debate team won a number of 1A-3A state competitions over the past 10 years. The Lincoln-Douglas Debate and Speech started in 2013, very successfully.

Robotics 
The For Inspiration and Recognition of Science and Technology Robotics team, Blue Tide Robotics, started in 2007 with several middle-school students' participation in FIRST Lego League. In 2014, they qualified for the semifinals again and also won the Quality Award.

Athletics
Phoenix Country Day School competes as a member school of the Arizona Interscholastic Association.

References

External links
 
 Archived school robotics site
 Arizona Interscholastic Association profile

Preparatory schools in Arizona
Schools in Phoenix, Arizona
High schools in Phoenix, Arizona
Educational institutions established in 1961
Private high schools in Arizona
Private middle schools in Arizona
Private elementary schools in Arizona
1961 establishments in Arizona